Professor Rodney Loudon  (born 25 July 1934) was a British physicist, best known for his work in quantum optics. He was Emeritus Professor of Theoretical Physics at the University of Essex.

Education 
Loudon attended the Bury Grammar School in Manchester. He received his Master of Arts (1956) and Doctor of Philosophy (1959) degrees from the University of Oxford, where he was a member of the Brasenose College.After  Oxford he undertook postdoctoral research at University of California, Berkeley

Research Work 
Loudon's research focused on various aspects of theoretical solid state and laser physics, and particularly on light scattering. His 1964 paper on the Raman effect was one of the 100 most cited papers in all areas of physical science between 1960 and 1969. He has published more than 190 papers and 3 books, one of which (the three editions of The Quantum Theory of Light) is recognized internationally and has been translated into Russian and Japanese.

His early work on excitons, phonons and magnons and his later treatments of non-classical effects in the statistical properties of light have attracted many citations. His later work on surface excitations and on optical amplification, attenuation and detection has also proved to be important.

Loudon worked at the University of Essex as Professor, Chairman and Dean. He has also worked at British Telecom, Royal Radar Establishment, Bell Telephone Laboratories and Radio Corporation of America, and he has been a consultant to these organisations over several years, contributing to both applied and fundamental research.
In addition to his physics research Loudon was a member of Institute of Physics Council and Opto-Electronics Group of Rank Prizes Committee.

Books 
 The Quantum Theory of Light (1973)
 Scattering of Light by Crystals (1978)
 An Introduction to the Properties of Condensed Matter (1989)

Awards and honours 
Loudon was elected a Fellow of the Royal Society (FRS) in 1987.
Young Medal and Prize 1987
Max Born Award 1992.
Humboldt Prize 1998.

References 

Living people
British physicists
Fellows of the Royal Society
1934 births
Alumni of Brasenose College, Oxford
Academics of the University of Essex